Reachy Prints is the seventh studio album by British electronic music duo Plaid released 19 May 2014 on Warp Records.

Release
Upon announcement of the album, Plaid released the track "Hawkmoth", and several weeks later revealed the single "Tether". "Tether" was accompanied with an interactive website that acted as a sort of music video that could be mutated by mouse and keyboard input from the user. Plaid continued marketing this track by releasing the stems and initializing a remix contest, the winner of which would receive a package of most of their releases on vinyl records as well as a MIDI instrument that would be used in live performances of the album.

Track listing

Charts

References

External links
Reachy Prints at the Warp Records website

2014 albums
Plaid (band) albums
Warp (record label) albums